Fateh Singh (died 1716) was a warrior in Sikh history. He is known for beheading Wazir Khan who was the Mughal Governor of Sirhind, administering a territory of the Mughal Empire between the Sutlej and Yamuna rivers. Wazir Khan was infamous for ordering the execution of the two young sons of Guru Gobind Singh, Sahibzada Fateh Singh and Sahibzada Zorawar Singh in 1704.

Battle of Chappar Chiri  
Fateh Singh  was in the Sikh Army led by Banda Singh Bahadur during the Battle of Chappar Chiri in May 1710. Wazir Khan was killed in the battlefield by two Sikhs,  Fateh Singh  and Baj Singh.  Fateh Singh  with the help of  Baj Singh  beheaded Wazir Khan, who marched from Sirhind and joined the battle against the Sikhs on 10 May 1710, at Chappar Chiri where today Fateh Burj commemorates the battle. A fierce battle ensued between the Sikhs and the Mughals. Wazir Khan was killed by the combined effort of two Sikhs Baj Singh and Fateh Singh who dealt the death blow vertically cutting down Wazir Khan from his shoulder to his waist. The Mughal Army of Sirhind took to heel and the Sikh Army captured Sirhind on 12 May 1710. The city was thoroughly sacked and retribution was wreaked on Wazir Khan's soldiers, officials and anyone even remotely connected with the execution of the younger sons of Guru Gobind Singh. The planned razing of Sirhind could not be carried out as the Sikh Army had to switch over to guerrilla warfare once the Imperial Army came.

Samana Administration in 1709

Fateh Singh  (d. 1716), an army commander under Banda Singh Bahadur, was appointed Administrator of Samana after the town was occupied by the Sikhs in 1709. Fateh Singh participated in several of Banda Singh's battles against the Mughal armies. In the Battle of Chappar Chiri, Fateh Singh killed Wazir Khan, the Mughal Faujdar of Sirhind. Fateh Singh was eventually taken prisoner by the Mughal Army at Lohgarh in December 1710 and, after several years in jail, he was executed in Delhi in June 1716 along with Banda Singh Bahadur and his other companions including many famous soldiers of the Sikh Army.

References

Sikh martyrs
History of Punjab
People executed for refusing to convert to Islam
People executed by the Mughal Empire
18th-century executions in India
People executed by starvation
1716 deaths